Peperina is a subgenus of moths of the family Noctuidae.

References
Natural History Museum Lepidoptera genus database

Cuculliinae
Insect subgenera